122nd Brigade may refer to:

 122nd Brigade (United Kingdom) of the British Army in the First World War
  of the Ukrainian Army

See also

 122nd Division (disambiguation)